Danny Shanahan (July 11, 1957 – July 5, 2021) was an American cartoonist who was known for his work for The New Yorker.

Life and career
Danny Shanahan was born on 11 July 1957 in Brooklyn, New York. He spent his early life in Long Island and later in Bethlehem, Connecticut, where he attended Paier College.

Shanahan formally started his career in the 1980s, when he became an unofficial cartoonist for the United States Tennis Association.

Between 1988 and 2020, Shanahan worked for The New Yorker as a cartoonist and illustrator. During that period, he published more than nine hundred cartoons in the magazine.

Books
 Buckledown the Workhound (1993)
 The Bus Ride That Changed History (2005)

References

1957 births
2021 deaths
American cartoonists
People from Brooklyn